DePaul Cristo Rey High School (DPCR) is a private, college-preparatory high school located in the Clifton neighborhood of Cincinnati, Ohio, United States. The non-diocesan school, which opened June 5, 2011, is one of 37 Catholic high schools that serve the Archdiocese of Cincinnati. Named after St. Vincent de Paul, it is operated by the Sisters of Charity of Cincinnati as the 25th member of the Cristo Rey Network of work-study schools that target students from low-income families who could not otherwise afford a college education.

History
DePaul Cristo Rey is located adjacent to Cincinnati State Technical and Community College at the former German-language Concordia Evangelical Lutheran Church, which disbanded on August 23, 2009, a year after closing its elementary school. In November 2009, the Sisters of Charity of Cincinnati purchased the building and grounds with the intention of establishing a Cristo Rey school.

DePaul Cristo Rey was dedicated June 5, 2011, and welcomed its first freshman class on August 17, 2011, to become Cincinnati's first new Catholic school since La Salle, Moeller, and McAuley High Schools opened in 1960.

Work-study
Following the Cristo Rey model, DePaul Cristo Rey's Corporate Work Study Program (CWSP) partners with over 100 local businesses and community organizations to provide each student with five days of clerical work a month. Companies pay the school $8,000 per student or $28,000 for four students. From its first three years, the school has established a 100% acceptance rate into colleges for its seniors.

References

External links
DePaul Cristo Rey High School official webpage
Sisters of Charity school profile
 More than a Dream (official book site)
Cristo Rey Network
 Partners - Cristo Rey Network 
 Fr. John P. Foley honored with Presidential Citizen's Medal
60 minutes
Cristo Rey Featured in WashPost column by George Will
 Boston Globe - With sense of purpose, students cut class for a day 
 Bill & Melinda Gates Foundation - Success of Innovative Urban Catholic School Sparks Major Investment

Cristo Rey Network
Private schools in Cincinnati
High schools in Hamilton County, Ohio
Catholic secondary schools in Ohio
Roman Catholic Archdiocese of Cincinnati
Educational institutions established in 2011
Poverty-related organizations
2011 establishments in Ohio